Armenia competed at the 2016 Summer Olympics in Rio de Janeiro, Brazil, from 5 to 21 August 2016. It was the nation's sixth consecutive appearance at the Summer Olympics in the post-Soviet era.

The National Olympic Committee of Armenia fielded a team of 32 athletes, 24 men and 8 women, across eight different sports at the Games. It was the nation's largest ever team sent to the Olympics, tying the record with the number of athletes achieved in Atlanta two decades earlier. The Armenian roster also highlighted its first ever female artistic gymnast, as well as the most female participation in its Olympic history.

Of the 32 participants, five of them competed at London 2012, including Greco-Roman wrestlers Arsen Julfalakyan (74 kg), who succeeded his father and head coach Levon to ascend the podium by taking the silver medal, and Artur Aleksanyan, who won a bronze in the heavyweight category, and later emerged himself as the reigning world champion twice (2013 and 2015). Other notable Armenian athletes featured American-born gymnast Houry Gebeshian, rifle shooter and 2014 Youth Olympic medalist Hrachik Babayan, and freestyle swimmer Vahan Mkhitaryan, who was selected by the committee to lead his delegation as the flag bearer in the opening ceremony.

Armenia left Rio de Janeiro with four medals (one gold and three silver), being considered its most successful Olympics since 1996. Among the nation's medalists were weightlifters Simon Martirosyan and Gor Minasyan, who each obtained silver in their respective weight categories, and Aleksanyan, who made history as Armenia's first ever Olympic champion after two decades, adding a gold to his career treasury of two world and three European titles.

Medalists

Competitors

Athletics
 
Armenian athletes have so far achieved qualifying standards in the following athletics events (up to a maximum of 3 athletes in each event):

Track & road events

Field events

Boxing

Armenia entered five boxers to compete in each of the following weight classes into the Olympic boxing tournament. Artur Hovhannisyan, Narek Abgaryan, Aram Avagyan, and Vladimir Margaryan had claimed their Olympic spots at the 2016 European Qualification Tournament in Samsun, Turkey. Meanwhile, light welterweight boxer Hovhannes Bachkov secured an additional place on the Armenian roster with his semifinal triumph at the 2016 APB and WSB Olympic Qualifier in Vargas, Venezuela.

Gymnastics

Artistic
Armenia entered three artistic gymnasts into the Olympic competition, including a first female Armenian gymnast. Harutyun Merdinyan had claimed his Olympic spot in the men's apparatus and all-around events at the 2015 World Championships, while two-time Olympian Artur Davtyan performed the same feat, as well as Houry Gebeshian in the women's at the Olympic Test Event in Rio de Janeiro.

Men

Women

Judo

Armenia qualified one judoka for the men's extra-lightweight category (60 kg) at the Games. London 2012 Olympian Hovhannes Davtyan was ranked among the top 22 eligible judokas for men in the IJF World Ranking List of 30 May 2016.

Shooting

Armenia received an invitation from ISSF to send 2014 Youth Olympic silver medalist Hrachik Babayan in the men's rifle events to the Olympics, as long as the minimum qualifying score (MQS) was met by 31 March 2016.

Qualification Legend: Q = Qualify for the next round; q = Qualify for the bronze medal (shotgun)

Swimming

Armenia received a Universality invitation from FINA to send two swimmers (one male and one female) to the Olympics.

Weightlifting

Armenian weightlifters have qualified five men's and two women's quota places for the Rio Olympics based on their combined team standing by points at the 2014 and 2015 IWF World Championships. The team must allocate these places to individual athletes by 20 June 2016.

Men

Women

Wrestling

Armenia qualified a total of eight wrestlers for each of the following weight classes into the Olympic competition. Three of them finished among the top six to book Olympic spots each in the men's freestyle 125 kg and men's Greco-Roman (66 & 98 kg) at the 2015 World Championships, while two additional licenses were awarded to Armenian wrestlers, who progressed to the top two finals in men's freestyle 57 kg at the 2016 European Qualification Tournament.

Three further wrestlers had claimed the remaining Olympic slots to round out the Armenian roster at the initial meet of the World Qualification Tournament in Ulaanbaatar.

On 11 May 2016, United World Wrestling awarded an additional Olympic license to Armenia in men's freestyle 65 kg, as a response to the doping violations for both the Polish and Ukrainian wrestler at the European Qualification Tournament.

Men's freestyle

Men's Greco-Roman

References

External links 

 

Olympics
2016
Nations at the 2016 Summer Olympics